Skarrild is a village (Danish: landsby) in Herning Municipality (Danish, kommune) in Central Denmark Region (Danish, Region Midtjylland), a part of the Jutland peninsula in northern Denmark.  It is notable as the location of the Danish Blues Guitar Festival and a memorial to RAF flyers who died there in 1944.

In 1944, it was the site of a deadly air skirmish during World War II near its Romanesque church, at which there is a memorial to the Royal Air Force fliers who died there.  On 27 August 1944, a seven-member RAF crew in a Lancaster ME650 from East Kirkby were killed in a crash when a German plane shot it down.

The Danish Folk, Blues, and Ragtime Guitar Festival in Skarrild attracts many international entertainers, including Thomasina Winslow.

References

External links
 Official government website in Danish
 Profile at MBendi.com
 Denmark Government Statistics Statistikbanken Tabel BEF44

Cities and towns in the Central Denmark Region
Herning Municipality